Corporal of horse (CoH) is a rank in the British Army's Household Cavalry corresponding to sergeant in other regiments. Formerly, no cavalry regiments had sergeants, but the Household Cavalry are the only ones to keep this tradition alive. It is said to stem from the origin of the word sergeant, which comes from the same root as servant. Since even the lowliest trooper in the Household Cavalry was once a gentleman, it was considered that such a rank was inappropriate. The rank of corporal of horse has existed since at least the 1660s. The rank below is Lance-corporal of horse and that above is staff corporal.

A corporal of horse wears three rank chevrons surmounted by a metal crown. They are addressed using their full rank title.

References

Military ranks of the British Army
Cavalry